Edward Ignatius Coan (born July 24, 1963) is an American powerlifter. He is widely regarded throughout the powerlifting world as the greatest powerlifter of all time. Coan has set over 71 world records in powerlifting.

Records
Throughout his active career in international powerlifting competition Ed Coan  has set over 71 world records in powerlifting.  He became the lightest person to cross the 2,400 lb. barrier in the powerlifting total (a sum of three lifts: the deadlift, bench, and squat).  He set an all-time powerlifting record total at 2,463 pounds, even though at the time he was not in the heaviest weight class.

Coan's best result in a drug tested international competition is 1,035 kg (2,282 lbs) in the 100 kg weight class at the 1994 IPF Senior World Championships. establishing a new world record at the time. Even though serving a lifetime ban from the IPF for doping, today Coan is among some people still acknowledged and regarded a legend in the world of powerlifting and spends much of his time mentoring young lifters coming into the sport.

Coan's best single ply lifts:
 Squat - 1019 lbs (~462 kg)
 Bench press - 584 lbs (~265 kg)
 Deadlift - 901 lbs (~409 kg) raw by today's standards with only singlet and belt
      Total: 2463.6 lbs (1117.5 kg)

Other lifts
His best competition lifts as a 220 lb lifter:

Squat - 961 lbs,

Bench - 584 lbs,

Deadlift - 901 lbs

The squat and deadlift attempts were 959 lbs and 898 lbs, respectively. After the competition the plates and barbell were weighed and the weight came out to be 961 and 901 lbs, respectively.  
Note that Ed Coan's lifts were completed under IPF Rules. Single layered suits and standard 2 meter knee wraps.

Drug ban
Coan has failed drug testing through the IPF three times. He was temporarily suspended in 1985 for the use of Deca-Durabolin, an anabolic steroid.

In 1989, he was suspended due to a positive drug test.

In 1996, at the IPF Men's Open World Championships in Salzburg, Austria, he tested positive again and was issued a lifetime ban from the IPF. Because this positive drug test occurred in a competition in which he placed first, his name and results have been retroactively removed from the 1996 results. Coan is now suspended from IPF for life.

In 2016, the IPF declared that due to Coan's suspension participating in his training seminars is a violation of WADA regulations and thus prohibited.

See also
List of strongmen
List of powerlifters

References

External links
Ed Coan at American Strength Legends
 Ode to the Power King Ed Coan! at RXMuscle.com
 Interview with Ed Coan

1963 births
Living people
American strength athletes
American powerlifters